{{Infobox Election
| election_name = 1968 United States presidential election in New Mexico
| country = New Mexico
| type = presidential
| ongoing = no
| previous_election = 1964 United States presidential election in New Mexico
| previous_year = 1964
| next_election = 1972 United States presidential election in New Mexico
| next_year = 1972
| election_date = November 5, 1968

| image_size = 129px
| image1 = Richard Nixon portrait.jpg
| nominee1 = Richard Nixon
| party1 = Republican Party (United States)
| home_state1 = New York
| running_mate1 = Spiro Agnew
| electoral_vote1 = 4
| popular_vote1 = 169,692
| percentage1 = 51.85%| image2 = Hubert Humphrey crop.jpg
| nominee2 = Hubert Humphrey
| party2 = Democratic Party (United States)
| home_state2 = Minnesota
| running_mate2 = Edmund Muskie
| electoral_vote2 = 0
| popular_vote2 = 130,081
| percentage2 = 39.75%

| image3 = George C Wallace.jpg
| nominee3 = George Wallace
| party3 = American Independent Party
| colour3=ff9955
| home_state3 = Alabama
| running_mate3 = S. Marvin Griffin
| electoral_vote3 = 0
| popular_vote3 = 25,737
| percentage3 = 7.86%
| map_image = New Mexico Presidential Election Results 1968.svg
| map_size = 300px
| map_caption = County ResultsNixonHumphrey| title = President
| before_election = Lyndon B. Johnson
| before_party = Democratic Party (United States)
| after_election = Richard Nixon
| after_party = Republican Party (United States)
}}

The 1968 United States presidential election in New Mexico''' took place on November 5, 1968. All fifty states and The District of Columbia, were part of the 1968 United States presidential election. State voters chose four electors to represent them in the Electoral College, who voted for president and vice president.

Background
New Mexico had been a long-time political bellwether, having supported the winning candidate in every presidential election since statehood in 1912. However, a definite Republican trend was detectable in 1964, when Goldwater was able to win a vote share two percent above his national mean and Johnson feared losing traditionally Southern Democratic "Little Texas".

The 1966 midterm elections saw the state join with larger "Sunbelt" dynamics and Democratic candidates for statewide offices would lose twelve percent or more of their previous vote share, in the process showing that Hispanic candidates were becoming a liability in Albuquerque and the east due to considerable in-migration, and legislative GOP percentages reached levels not observed for over four decades.

Local issues of public school finance and land-grant claims for the Hispanic and Native American populations of the state proved a further liability for the incumbent Democratic Party. The issue of the stalemated Vietnam War was another problem for the Democratic Party in a state severely affected by poverty, and anti-war Eugene McCarthy gained substantial support among New Mexico Democrats before the assassination of Bobby Kennedy largely turned them toward eventual nominee Hubert Humphrey.

Vote
Incumbent Vice President Hubert Humphrey and segregationist American Independent Party candidate and former Governor of Alabama George Wallace campaigned in New Mexico during the autumn, whilst running mate Spiro Agnew did all the campaigning for Republican Richard Nixon in the state. Despite his failure to visit, New Mexico was won by former Vice President Nixon by a 12-point margin against Humphrey. Wallace, far from his base in the Deep South, did well among working and lower-middle class unionized workers and farmers in the "Little Texas" region, but received some of his poorest national percentages in the north-central highland regions – Mora County gave Wallace his eleventh-smallest vote share of any county in the country.

Nixon's victory was the first of six consecutive Republican victories in the state, as New Mexico would not vote for a Democratic candidate again until Bill Clinton in 1992. Since then it has become a Democratic leaning swing state, with only narrowly voting Republican once, when George W. Bush won New Mexico over then Democratic presidential candidate John Kerry by a very slim margin in 2004.

Results

Results by county

Notes

References

New Mexico
1968 New Mexico elections
1968